Jessica Hutchings is a New Zealand researcher, author, and Ashtanga Yoga teacher. Hutchings' work is grounded in kaupapa Māori research (research informed by tikanga Māori ) within the subject areas of environmental and Indigenous studies.

Career 
Hutchings completed a PhD in environmental studies and completed a post-doctoral fellowship in Maori health research. She was the Director Māori, Tumu Whakarae of the Building Better Homes Towns and Cities National Science Challenge from 2018-2021 leading a Māori research program in the Challenge. Hutchings is also a member of the MBIE Science Board.

She cited the New Zealand COVID-19 lockdown as encouraging wider conversation and action around food sovereignty, saying "Since the Covid lockdown, it’s just been right at the forefront of everything… We’re right on conversations around what food security is, we’re beginning to have conversations as whanau Māori."

Along with Victoria University associate Jo Smith (Kāi Tahu, Kāti Māmoe, Waitaha) Hutchings founded Papawhakaritorito Charitable Trust, which focuses on food sovereignty education and research, and includes food growing initiatives such as Feed The Whānau.

Recognition 

 2016 Māori Book Awards, Te Kōrero Pono - Non-Fiction Winner for Te Mahi Mara Hua Parakore: A Maori Food Sovereignty Handbook

Personal life 
From Ngai Tahu, Gujarati, and Ngāti Huirapa descent, Hutchings' work primarily focuses on Māori food sovereignty and decolonization.

Selected works

Publications

Filmed Lectures and Documentaries 

 Hua Parakore: A kaupapa Māori pathway for Maori soil and food sovereignty. Toi Tangata, 2021. New Zealand.
 Hua Parakore: Living Indigenous Food Sovereignty. Happen Films, 2021. New Zealand.

References 

Living people
Year of birth missing (living people)
New Zealand women academics
New Zealand Māori academics
New Zealand Māori women academics
Ngāi Tahu people